Chain Reaction is a 1975 album by jazz-fusion band The Crusaders.

Reception

The Allmusic review by Jim Newsom says the album "finds the Crusaders at the top of their form" and that it is "one of the tastiest concoctions of the mid-'70s jazz-fusion era". It concludes that Chain Reaction "helped lure young, rock and soul-oriented listeners over to check out the jazz side".

Track listing 
"Creole" – 3:25
"Chain Reaction" – 5:35
"I Felt The Love" – 2:28
"Mellow Out" – 2:44
"Rainbow Visions" – 6:15
"Hallucinate" – 5:08
"Give It Up" – 2:56
"Hot's It" – 3:50
"Sugar Cane" – 2:31
"Soul Caravan" – 5:30

Personnel
The Crusaders
Wayne Henderson - Trombone
Wilton Felder - Bass, saxophone
Joe Sample - Keyboards
Stix Hooper - Drums
Larry Carlton - Guitar

Charts

Singles

References

External links
 Crusaders-Chain Reaction  at Discogs

The Crusaders albums
Blue Thumb Records albums
1975 albums
Albums produced by Stewart Levine
ABC Records albums